The Hong Kong Heritage Discovery Centre is located in the Kowloon Park, Haiphong Road, Tsim Sha Tsui, Kowloon, Hong Kong. The Centre occupies the historic Blocks S61 and S62 of the former Whitfield Barracks at the Kowloon Park.

History
The two blocks were built in circa 1910, when Hong Kong was under British rule as a crown colony. They were used for accommodating British troops until 1967 when the military lands were returned to the colonial government for redevelopment for leisure services. They were used by the Hong Kong Museum of History as its temporary premises from 1983 to 1998 until the new museum complex was built in Tsim Sha Tsui East.

Discovery Centre
The Hong Kong Heritage Discovery Centre is under the management of the Antiquities and Monuments Office. It has opened its door to visitors since October 2005 with its thematic exhibition gallery, lecture hall, educational activity room and reference library. It includes a standing exhibition on Hong Kong's architectural heritage.

Public transport
The centre is accessible within walking distance North West from Tsim Sha Tsui station via the MTR.

See also 
 Heritage conservation in Hong Kong
 Hong Kong Heritage Museum
 Hong Kong Museum of History

References
 Official website of the Hong Kong Heritage Discovery Centre

External links

 UNESCO Asia Pacific Heritage Awards: Whitfield Barracks

Tsim Sha Tsui
History of Hong Kong
Museums in Hong Kong
Grade I historic buildings in Hong Kong
Local museums in China